Nadia Farès (Arabic: نادية فارس , born 20 December 1968 in Marrakech, Morocco) is a French actress. She made her film debut in 1992, with My Wife's Girlfriends. She rose to fame with the police thriller Les Rivières pourpres (The Crimson Rivers). She appeared as Jade Agent Kinler in the 2007 action/thriller War, and as Pia in the 2007 horror film Storm Warning.

Filmography
 Cinema
1992 : My Wife's Girlfriends by Didier Van Cauwelaert : Béatrice de Mennoux
1994 : Elles n'oublient jamais by Christopher Frank : Angela
1995 : Policier by Giulio Base : Stella
1995 : Dis-moi oui... by Alexandre Arcady : Florence
1996 : Hommes, femmes : mode d'emploi by Claude Lelouch : The new secretary of Blanc
1997 : Les Démons de Jésus by Bernie Bonvoisin : Marie
1997 : Sous les pieds des femmes by Rachida Krim : Fouzia
1999 : Les Grandes Bouches by Bernie Bonvoisin : Esther
1999 : A Monkey's Tale (Le Château des singes) by Jean-François Laguionie : voice of Gina
2000 : The Crimson Rivers (Les Rivières pourpres) by Mathieu Kassovitz : Fanny Ferreira
2001 : Coup franc indirect by Youcef Hamidi
2002 : The Nest (Nid de guêpes) by Florent Emilio Siri : Hélène Laborie
2002 : Le Mal de vivre by Jean-Michel Pascal : Sandrine
2004 : Pour le plaisir by Dominique Deruddere : Julie, François' wife
2005 : L'Ex-femme de ma vie by Josiane Balasko : Ariane
2007 : Insane by Jamie Blanks
2007 : Storm Warning by Jamie Blanks : Pia
2017 : Chacun sa vie et son intime conviction by Claude Lelouch
2019 : Lucky Day by Roger Avary

 Television
1990 : Navarro : Sara (TV series, season 2, episode 1 : Fils de périph)
1991 : The Exile : Jacquie Decaux
1992 : Le Second Voyage by Jean-Jacques Goron : Yasmina
1992 : Force de frappe (Counterstrike) : Jeanette (Season 3, Episode 5 : No Honour Among Thieves)
1995 : Le Cavalier des nuages by Gilles Béhat : Melka
1995 : Quatre pour un loyer
1996 : Flairs ennemis by Robin Davis : Karen
2001 : L'Enfant de la nuit by Marian Handwerker : Eva
2002 : Apporte-moi ton amour by Éric Cantona : Nan
2006 : L'Empire du Tigre by Gérard Marx : Gabrielle
2007 : Rogue : L'Ultime Affrontement (War) by Philip G. Atwell : Agent Jade
2009 : Revivre by Haim Bouzaglo : Emma Elbaz (TV series, 6 episodes)
2016 : Marseille (TV series)
2020 : La Promesse (TV series) : Inès

References

External links
 
 

1968 births
Living people
People from Marrakesh
Moroccan emigrants to France
French film actresses
French television actresses
Moroccan film actresses
Moroccan television actresses
20th-century Moroccan actresses
21st-century Moroccan actresses
20th-century French women